Bliestorf is a municipality in the district of Lauenburg, in Schleswig-Holstein, Germany.

Sights
 Herrenhaus, built in 1843 by landowner and forester August Luis Detlev von Schrader (1827–1859) in the Swiss style.

References

Municipalities in Schleswig-Holstein
Herzogtum Lauenburg